USS Nassau may refer to:

 was an escort aircraft carrier in service from 1943 to 1946.
 is an amphibious assault ship commissioned 1979 and decommissioned in 2011

United States Navy ship names